OMT may refer to:

Technology
 OMT-G, configuration in object-based spatial databases
 Object-modeling technique, language for software modeling and designing
 Object model template, architecture for distributed computer simulation systems
 Open microchip technology, the technology of implanting microchips in animals for research or tracking
 Orthomode transducer, also polarisation duplexer, microwave duct component of the class of microwave circulators

Health and wellness
 Osteopathic manipulative treatment, hands-on application of manipulative techniques on the patient by a Doctor of Osteopathic Medicine
 Ocular tremor, also ocular microtremor, type of eye tremor
 Orofacial Myofunctional Therapy, most commonly used to retrain oral rest posture, swallowing patterns, and speech

Other
 Outright Monetary Transactions, which denotes the European Central Bank's purchases of bonds issued by Eurozone member-states
 O-methyltransferase, type of methyltransferase enzyme transferring a methyl group on a molecule